The  was fought in 1478 between the forces of Chiba Noritane (千葉孝胤) and the forces of Ōta Dōkan and Chiba Yoritane (千葉自胤). The battle is also sometimes referred to as the Sakainehara Campaign (境根原の役 Sakainehara no Eki).

References 

Sakainehara
1470s in Japan
1478 in Asia
Sakainehara